Octanone may refer to any of three isomeric chemical compounds:

 2-Octanone
 3-Octanone
 4-Octanone

Octanones